Gudanjir (also Romanized as Gūdānjīr) is a village in Haparu Rural District, in the Central District of Bagh-e Malek County, Khuzestan Province, Iran. At the 2006 census, its population was 131, in 24 families.

References 

Populated places in Bagh-e Malek County